"The Best Thing" is a song by Australian band Boom Crash Opera. It was released on 27 November 1989 as the third single from their second studio album, These Here Are Crazy Times! (1989). The song was featured in the 1991 film Don't Tell Mom the Babysitter's Dead and was included on its soundtrack album.

Track listing
7" single
 "The Best Thing" – 4:13
 "Flying a Kite in the Rain" – 3:03
 "Safer in Cages" – 4:29

Charts

Listen!! mix

On 10 December 1990, Boom Crash Opera released "The Best Thing (Listen!! mix)" as the first and only single from the band's remix album, Look! Listen!! (1990). It peaked at number 112 on the ARIA Singles Chart in February 1991.

Track listing
12" single
 "The Best Thing" (Listen!! mix) – 7:27
 "The Best Thing" (Listen!! 7" edit) – 4:40
 "The Best Thing" (Smashin' Dub) – 5:36

Charts

Hook n Sling version

In 2008, "The Best Thing" was remixed by Australian DJ and producer Hook n Sling, and released under the title "The Best Thing (2008)", through Hussle Recordings. The vocals were re-recorded by Boom Crash Opera singer Dale Ryder for the release. "The Best Thing (2008)" reached number 27 on the ARIA Singles Chart, and spent eight weeks at number one on the ARIA Club Tracks Chart.

Track listings
Digital release
"The Best Thing (2008)" (radio edit) – 4:02
"The Best Thing (2008)" (club edit) – 7:30
"The Best Thing (2008)" (Tonite Only remix) – 7:00
"The Best Thing (2008)" (TV Rock remix) – 7:09
"The Best Thing (2008)" (Noel Sinner remix) – 5:42

CD single
"The Best Thing (2008)" (radio edit)
"The Best Thing (2008)" (club edit)
"The Best Thing (2008)" (TV Rock remix)

Charts

Weekly charts

Year-end charts

Release history

References

External links 
Boom Crash Opera website

1989 songs
1989 singles
Boom Crash Opera songs
Songs written by Richard Pleasance
Warner Music Group singles